Allan Sekula (January 15, 1951 – August 10, 2013) was an American photographer, writer, filmmaker, theorist and critic. From 1985 until his death in 2013, he taught at California Institute of the Arts. His work frequently focused on large economic systems, or "the imaginary and material geographies of the advanced capitalist world."

He received fellowships and grants from the Guggenheim Foundation, National Endowment for the Arts, Getty Research Institute, Deutsche Akademischer Austauschdienst (DAAD), Atelier Calder and was named a 2007 USA Broad Fellow.

Life and work
Sekula was born in 1951 in Erie, Pennsylvania, of Polish and English descent. His family moved to San Pedro, California in the early 1960s. He graduated with his MFA from the University of California, San Diego, in 1974, after having obtained his BA in biology from the same institution.

Sekula's principal medium was photography, which he employed to create exhibitions, books and films. His secondary medium was the written word, employing essays and other critical texts  in concert with images to create a multi-level critique of contemporary late capitalism. His works make critical contributions on questions of social reality and globalization, and focus on what he described as "the imaginary and material geographies of the advanced capitalist world". He was a film/video-maker, frequently collaborating with film theorist Noël Burch on projects such as The Reagan Tapes (1984) (with regard to Ronald Reagan), and The Forgotten Space (2010).

He served on the faculty of the Photography and Media Program at the California Institute of the Arts.

Sekula died on August 10, 2013, aged 62, following a long struggle with gastric-esophageal cancer.

Books
Photography Against the Grain: Essays and Photo Works 1973–1983 (1984).
Fish Story (1995).
London: Mack, 2018. . With a new introduction by Laleh Khalili.
Dead Letter Office (1997).
Geography Lesson: Canadian Notes (1997).
Seemannsgarn (2002).
Titanic's Wake (2003).
Performance under Working Conditions (2003).
A Dialogue with Allan Sekula (2005).
Facing the Music: Documenting Walt Disney Hall and the Redevelopment of Downtown Los Angeles. East of Borneo Books, 2015. . A project by Sekula. Edited by Edward Dimendberg, with contributions by Sekula, Louis Adamic, James Baker, Laura Diamond Dixit, Anthony Hernandez, Karin Apollonia Müller, Leonard Nadel, and Billy Woodberry.

Films 
A Short Film for Laos (2006)
The Forgotten Space (2010)

Awards
1977: Art Critic's Fellowship, National Endowment for the Arts
1978: Artist's Fellowship, National Endowment for the Arts
1980: Art Critic's Fellowship., National Endowment for the Arts
1986: Guggenheim Fellowship from the John Simon Guggenheim Memorial Foundation
1999 - 2002: Research Grant, Getty Research Institute / J. Paul Getty Trust
2007: USA Broad Fellow and granted $50,000 by United States Artists
Fellowship from the Deutsche Akademischer Austauschdienst (DAAD)
Fellowship from the Atelier Calder

Exhibitions

Collections

Sekula's work is held in the following public collections:
 Thyssen-Bornemisza Art Contemporary Collection, Vienna, Austria	
 Museo de Arte Reina Sofia, Madrid, Spain	
 Museu d'Art Contemporani de Barcelona, Barcelona, Spain	
 Museum Boijmans Van Beuningen, Rotterdam, Netherlands	
 Museum of Contemporary Art, Los Angeles, CA
 National Museum of Contemporary Art, Athens, Greece	
Columbus Museum of Art, Columbus, Ohio
 Orange County Museum of Art, Newport Beach, CA
 Pompidou Center, Paris
 San Diego Museum of Contemporary Art, La Jolla, CA
San Diego Museum of Contemporary Art, La Jolla, CA
 Whitney Museum, New York	
 Art Gallery of New South Wales, Sydney, Australia	
 ARCO Foundation, Madrid, Spain	
 Centro de Estudos Fotograficos, Vigo, Spain	
 Folkwang Museum, Essen, Germany
 Fonds National d'Art Contemporain, Paris
 Getty Research Institute, Resource Collections, Los Angeles, CA
 Harn Museum of Art, Gainesville, Florida 	
 Los Angeles County Museum of Art, Los Angeles, CA
 Museé des Beaux Arts et de la Dentelle, Calais, France	
 Museo de Arte Contemporaneo, Castilla y León, Spain

See also 
Allan Sekula Library at the Clark Art Institute

References

External links
Ben Lerner on Sekula in Frieze
Colloquium on Allan Sekula  at the Centre Pompidou (Paris) hosted by Marie Muracciole June 28, 2013
Allan Sekula represented by Christopher Grimes Gallery, Santa Monica, CA
Interview with Allan Sekula about the relationship between art and photography, about artistic activism, the role of the artist in the public sphere and "Waiting for Tear Gas" (2011).
Allan Sekula Kapsul Image Collection
 

1951 births
2013 deaths
American people of Polish descent
Photographers from Pennsylvania
California Institute of the Arts faculty
Deaths from cancer in California
Deaths from esophageal cancer
Writers from Erie, Pennsylvania
Artists from Pennsylvania
Artists from Erie, Pennsylvania